The 2019 G20 Osaka summit was the fourteenth meeting of the G20, a forum of 19 countries and the EU that together represent most of the world economy. It was held on 28–29 June 2019 at the International Exhibition Center in Osaka. It was the first G20 summit to be hosted by Japan.

Participating leaders

Invited guests

International organization guests

Issues

The 2019 G20 Summit discussed eight themes to Ensure Global Sustainable Development. The eight themes were "Global Economy", "Trade and Investment", "Innovation", "Environment and Energy", "Employment", "Women's Empowerment", "Development" and "Health".

Regards to "Trade and Investment", support for the necessary reform of the World Trade Organization (WTO) was agreed. WHO Director-General Roberto Azevêdo had been participating in the summit, welcomed the communique.

Regards to "Innovation", necessity of respected and interoperable frameworks on Data Free Flow with Trust, both domestic and international, was discussed.

Regards to "Environment and Energy", a common global vision, the "Osaka Blue Ocean Vision" which is aiming to reduce additional pollution by marine plastic litter to zero by 2050 through a comprehensive life-cycle approach was shared.

Leaders' Special Event was also held, and "Digital Economy" and "Women’s Empowerment" were discussed. During the former event, "Osaka Declaration on Digital Economy" was issued, in which those leaders declared the launch of the "Osaka Track", a process which demonstrates their commitment to promote efforts on international rule-making on digital economy, especially on data flow and electronic commerce. Regards to the latter event, a press release compiling the messages from the leaders on their national measures and commitment regarding women's empowerment was issued after the event.

Related topics
The Ministry of Foreign Affairs of the People's Republic of China has issued a statement considering the Hong Kong Protests as China's internal affairs on June 24. The Chinese government wanted to delist the Hong Kong issue from the summit's agenda for the year, to avoid possible political and security confrontations between all G20 leaders (from outside China) and China. China has threatened to attack G20 nations suspected for “wrongfully” accusing China. However, Japanese Prime Minister Abe had raised the issue to President Xi just before the official summit, while some Hong Kong citizens protested in places around the summit venue. Pro-independence leader Chan Ho-tin demonstrated with people from Chinese ethnic minorities like Rebiya Kadeer for Hong Kong, as well as Xinjiang issues.

On June 29, President of the United States Donald Trump offered North Korea's Kim Jong-un a weekend meeting in the demilitarized zone, and the 2019 Koreas–United States DMZ Summit was realized.

See also
 2019 Koreas–United States DMZ Summit – held on June 30, 2019
 Anti-Korean sentiment in Japan
 Japan–South Korea trade dispute – began on July 1, 2019
 Korea Passing
 List of G20 summits

References

External links
 Official website of the G20 
 Official website of G20 Osaka Summit 2019
 Profiles of G20 leaders
 Towards Osaka Blue Ocean Vision

2019 conferences
2019 in Japan
2019 in international relations
21st-century diplomatic conferences (Global)
Diplomatic conferences in Japan
21st century in Osaka
2019
Anti-Korean sentiment in Japan
June 2019 events in Asia
June 2019 events in Japan